RealClearPolitics (RCP) is an American political news website and polling data aggregator formed in 2000 by former options trader John McIntyre and former advertising agency account executive Tom Bevan. The site features selected political news stories and op-eds from various news publications in addition to commentary from its own contributors. The site is prominent during election seasons for its aggregation of polling data.

In 2008, the site's founders said their goal was to give readers "ideological diversity". According to a 2012 article in the Chicago Sun-Times, competitors and people inside politics have praised the site's balance of stories, although a 2020 article in The New York Times noted that since the end of 2017, RealClearPolitics has had a rightward, pro-Donald Trump turn in its content. According to a 2020 Knight Foundation study, RealClearPolitics is generally read by a moderate audience, leaning slightly toward the right.

Establishment
The website was founded in 2000 by McIntyre, a former trader at the Chicago Board Options Exchange, and Bevan, a former advertising agency account executive.  McIntyre explained "it really wasn't any more complicated than there should be a place online that pulled together all this quality information." They call what they do "intelligent aggregation". The site has grown in election-season spurts since it first went online. It has expanded from a two-man operation to a full-time staff of more than two dozen employees overseeing the company's mainstay, RealClearPolitics, as well as ten smaller sites.

Both co-founders graduated from Princeton in 1991. When they launched the site, they would both start their day at 4 a.m., looking through articles from more than 50 sources. They post pieces on current events and topics, as well as news about opinion polls. The site reports on political races and projections, and features the average result of all current presidential polls and also offers a best-guess projection of Electoral College votes.

Political orientation

2000 to 2017
In a 2001 article for Princeton Alumni Weekly, editor Rob MacKay noted that "The articles selected invariably demonstrate McIntyre and Bevan's political bent, about which they are unabashedly forthcoming." McIntyre said, "I'm not really a die-hard Republican because my interests are less on social issues, more on taxing and spending. ... But I definitely don't want the government telling me what to do with my property...  Nevertheless, any political junkie—even a liberal—would enjoy our site because the topics we choose are current."

In a 2003 interview with the conservative magazine Human Events, McIntyre described the philosophy behind the website as based on "freedom" and "common-sense values"; Bevan said that the website's owners shared the common conservative belief that the mainstream media was biased "against conservatives, religious conservatives, [and] Christian conservatives".

In a 2004 article for Time, Patrick Stack described the website's commentary section as "right-leaning".

In a 2008 interview with the Chicago Tribune, McIntyre said, "We're trying to pull together the best political stories, op-eds, news analyses, editorials out there. The proliferation of content is enormous. Part of what we're trying to do is distill it in a clear, simple way for people who don't have hours to spend searching the Net." In 2008, the site's founders said their goal was to give readers "ideological diversity". 

In 2008, Politico executive editor Jim VandeHei has called the site "an essential stop for anyone interested in politics". 

In 2009, RealClearPolitics was described as a weblog "in the conservative pantheon" by Richard Davis.

During the 2008 elections, The Wall Street Journal repeatedly referred to RealClearPolitics as "nonpartisan". The New York Times referred to its polling practice as a "nonpartisan tally".

In 2012, the Chicago Sun-Times noted that "competitors, political operatives and elected officials who regularly consult the site say they appreciate the balance of stories that Bevan, McIntyre and their staff choose." BuzzFeed's top editor called their polling average "the Dow Jones of campaign coverage".

The 2012–2013 edition of academic text Cengage Advantage Books: American Government and Politics Today, Brief Edition describes the site as being run by conservatives, and containing "opinion pieces from multiple media sources".

Rightward turn during Trump's presidency 
In 2020, The New York Times noted that since 2017, when a large number of its straight news journalists were laid off, RealClearPolitics has had a rightward, pro-Trump turn with donations to its affiliated nonprofit increasing, with much of that from entities used by wealthy conservatives. Several journalists who talked to The New York Times in 2020 said they never felt any pressure from the site's founders to bias their stories. The New York Times also said that "Real Clear became one of the most prominent platforms for elevating unverified and reckless stories about the president's political opponents, through a mix of its own content and articles from across conservative media" and that for days after the election, "Real Clear Politics gave top billing to stories that reinforced the false narrative that the president could still somehow eke out a win." Some allies of Donald Trump falsely claimed that RealClearPolitics had rescinded its call of Pennsylvania for Biden; however, the website had not yet called a winner in the state.

An October 2019 article in The Daily Beast reported that RealClear Media manages a Facebook page of "far-right memes and Islamophobic smears". Anand Ramanujan, chief technology officer for RealClear Media, responded that the company created the website that was affiliated with the Facebook page "as part of an effort to understand the flow of traffic from social media—particularly Facebook—to political websites."

Real Clear Politics heavily promotes content by The Federalist, a conservative website which draws funding from the same pool of donor money as Real Clear Politics.

In 2016, RealClearInvestigations was launched, backed by foundations associated with conservative causes, such as the Ed Uihlein Family Foundation and Sarah Scaife Foundation. In 2019, the site published an article by a conservative author, Paul Sperry, containing the supposed name of a U.S. intelligence officer who blew the whistle on the Trump–Ukraine scandal. The article's publication came as part of a month-long effort by Trump allies on media and social media to "unmask" the whistleblower, whose identity was kept confidential by the U.S. government, in accordance with whistleblower protection (anti-retaliation) laws. Most publications declined to reveal the whistleblower's identity; Tom Kuntz, editor of RealClearInvestigations, defended the site's decision to publish the article.

Ownership 
Forbes Media LLC bought a 51% equity interest in the site in 2007. On May 19, 2015, RealClearInvestors and Crest Media announced that they had bought out Forbes's stake for an undisclosed amount.

RealClearPolitics also owns RealClearMarkets, RealClearWorld, and RealClearSports. RealClearMarkets and RealClearSports were launched in November 2007. RealClearWorld, the international news and politics site, was launched in August 2008. RealClearScience and RealClearReligion launched in October 2010. RealClearHistory launched in 2012; in 2013, RealClearDefense was launched to cover military, intelligence, and veterans' issues.

Original content 
In addition to linking to external content, RealClearPolitics also provides original commentary and reporting, with a staff that includes White House reporter Philip Wegmann, White House & national political correspondent Susan Crabtree, and associate editor and columnist A.B. Stoddard, and columnist J. Peder Zane. 

Former employees include Caitlin Huey-Burns, Alexis Simendinger, James Arkin, Mike Memoli, Kyle Trygstad, Reid Wilson, and Rebecca (Berg) Buck.

Political poll averaging 
RealClearPolitics aggregates polls for presidential and congressional races into averages, known as the RealClearPolitics average, which are widely cited by media outlets. In 2008, Nate Silver of FiveThirtyEight said that RealClearPolitics was rigging its averages to favor Senator John McCain and other Republicans, although he later receded from this claim, indicating that his site and RCP had a friendly rivalry. McIntyre denied having a conservative bent, saying that the site was a business and had "no interest in screwing around with that for partisan purposes". 

In 2012, Ben Smith, editor-in-chief of BuzzFeed, said "They are a huge force. Their polling average is the Dow Jones of campaign coverage."

In 2016, Republicans performed 1.7% better than the final RealClearPolitics average, and Republicans performed 3.3% better than the site's average in 2014. In the 2016 presidential election, the final RealClearPolitics average margin overestimated Democrat Hillary Clinton's popular vote performance by 1.3%. The final electoral college prediction map produced by RealClearPolitics predicted the average outcome to be that she would narrowly win the election with 272 electoral votes. However, she lost the election to Republican Donald Trump despite winning the popular vote. In 2018, the site underestimated the Democratic vote in the 2018 congressional elections by just over one percentage point.

Right before Super Tuesday during the 2016 presidential primaries, Bevan called Super Tuesday for Donald Trump, telling The New York Times, "It will be a Trump tsunami" and predicting a Trump victory in every state holding a primary that day except for Texas.

See also 
 Historical polling for United States presidential elections
 List of polling organizations
 Opinion poll

References

External links 

 

2000 establishments in Illinois
American political websites
Internet properties established in 2000
News aggregators